The 2019 Tianjin Teda F.C. season saw the Tianjin TEDA F.C team competing in the Chinese Super League and Chinese FA Cup. The season was Teda's 22nd professional season under its current name. The club finished 14th place during the 2018 Chinese league season and managed to escape being relegated.

Current squad

Friendlies

Pre-season

Formal Competitions

Chinese Super League

Results

Chinese FA Cup

First match to be played in April or May.

References

External links 
 

Tianjin Jinmen Tiger F.C. seasons
Tianjin Teda F.C.